Democratic centralism is a practice in which political decisions reached by voting processes are binding upon all members of the political party. It is mainly associated with Leninism, wherein the party's political vanguard of revolutionaries practised democratic centralism to select leaders and officers, determine policy, and execute it. Democratic centralism has also been practised by social democratic and democratic socialist parties as well. Scholars have disputed whether democratic centralism was implemented in practice in the Soviet Union and China, pointing to violent power struggles, backhanded political maneuvering, historical antagonisms and the politics of personal prestige in those regimes.

In practice 

In party meetings, a motion (new policy or amendment, goal, plan or any other kind of political question) is proposed. After a period of debate, a vote is taken. If one vote clearly wins (gaining a share of 60% or above among two options, for example) all party members are expected to follow that decision, and not continue debating it. The goal is to avoid decisions being undermined by participants whose views were in the minority. In the development of socialism in the Soviet Union and China, it was implemented in response to rapid political developments and violence, which required faster mechanisms of decision-making. It also had the effect of reducing internal debate within the party, which was permitted only before the vote. Several related practices were adopted, such as "Don't Blame the Speaker".

Lenin's conception and practice 

The text What Is to Be Done? from 1902 is popularly seen as the founding text of democratic centralism. At this time, democratic centralism was generally viewed as a set of principles for the organizing of a revolutionary workers' party. However, Vladimir Lenin's model for such a party, which he repeatedly discussed as being "democratic centralist", was the German Social Democratic Party, inspired by remarks made by the social democrat Jean Baptista von Schweitzer. Lenin described democratic centralism as consisting of "freedom of discussion, unity of action".

The doctrine of democratic centralism served as one of the sources of the split between the Bolsheviks and the Mensheviks. The Mensheviks supported a looser party discipline within the Russian Social Democratic Labour Party in 1903 as did Leon Trotsky, in Our Political Tasks, although Trotsky joined ranks with the Bolsheviks in 1917.

The Sixth Party Congress of the Russian Social-Democratic Labour Party (Bolsheviks) held at Petrograd between 26 July and 3 August 1917 defined democratic centralism as follows:
 That all directing bodies of the Party, from top to bottom, shall be elected.
 That Party bodies shall give periodical accounts of their activities to their respective Party organization.
 That there shall be strict Party discipline and the subordination of the minority to the majority.
 That all decisions of higher bodies shall be absolutely binding on lower bodies and on all Party members.

After the successful consolidation of power by the Communist Party following the October Revolution and the Russian Civil War, the Bolshevik leadership, including Lenin, instituted a ban on factions in the party as Resolution No. 12 of the 10th Party Congress in 1921. It was passed in the morning session on 16 March 1921. Trotskyists sometimes claim that this ban was intended to be temporary, but there is no language in the discussion at the 10th Party Congress suggesting such.

The Group of Democratic Centralism was a group in the Soviet Communist Party who advocated different concepts of party democracy.

In On Party Unity, Lenin argued that democratic centralism prevents factionalism. He argued that factionalism leads to less friendly relations among members and that it can be exploited by enemies of the party.

By the Brezhnev period, democratic centralism was described in the 1977 Soviet Constitution as a principle for organizing the state: "The Soviet state is organized and functions on the principle of democratic centralism, namely the electiveness of all bodies of state authority from the lowest to the highest, their accountability to the people, and the obligation of lower bodies to observe the decisions of higher ones."

Soviet practice 
For much of the time between the era of Joseph Stalin and the 1980s, the principle of democratic centralism meant that the Supreme Soviet, while nominally vested with great lawmaking powers, did little more than approve decisions already made at the highest levels of the Communist Party. When the Supreme Soviet was not in session, the Presidium of the Supreme Soviet performed its ordinary functions. It also had the power to issue decrees in lieu of law. Nominally, if such decrees were not ratified at the Supreme Soviet's next session, they were considered revoked. However, ratification was usually a mere formality, though occasionally even this formality was not observed.  Thus, decisions made by the Party's top leaders de facto had the force of law.

The democratic centralist principle extended to elections in the Soviet Union. All socialist countries were—either de jure or de facto—one-party states. In most cases, the voters were presented with a single list of unopposed candidates, which usually won 90 percent or more of the vote.

China 

The Leninist practice of democratic centralism has been introduced during the Republic of China era to the Kuomintang in 1923. It was allied with the Chinese Communist Party during the Warlord Era and received support from the Soviet Union. The organizational structures of the Kuomintang would remain in place until the democratization on Taiwan in the 1990s and would serve as a structural basis of several Taiwanese political parties such as the Democratic Progressive Party.

Democratic centralism is also stated in Article 3 of the present Constitution of the People's Republic of China: Article 3. The state organs of the People's Republic of China apply the principle of democratic centralism. The National People's Congress and the local people's congresses at different levels are instituted through democratic election. They are responsible to the people and subject to their supervision. All administrative, judicial and procuratorial organs of the state are created by the people's congresses to which they are responsible and under whose supervision they operate. The division of functions and powers between the central and local state organs is guided by the principle of giving full play to the initiative and enthusiasm of the local authorities under the unified leadership of the central authorities.

This idea is translated into the supremacy of the National People's Congress, which represents China's citizens and exercises legislative authority on their behalf. Other powers, including the power to appoint the head of state and head of government, are also vested in this body.

Vietnam 
The Communist Party of Vietnam is organized according to the Leninist principle of democratic centralism. According to the regulations of the Party, democratic centralism is performed following these rules:
Party leadership bodies at all level are chosen by voting. Practicing the collective leadership with individual responsibility.
Highest Party leadership body is the National Congress. Regional leadership bodies are the corresponding representative assembly. Between the two congress events, the executive leadership body is the Central Committee, regional executing leadership bodies are the Party Committees.
A regional committee has to report to and take responsibility before the Party assembly at the same level and the committees at the below and above level. It has to periodically report its situation to the relevant Party bodies and perform criticism and self-criticism.
Party members and bodies have to obey the Party Resolutions. Minority has to obey majority, bodies at lower level has to obey the ones at higher level, individual has to obey the whole team, the Party bodies have to obey the National Congress and Central Committee.
The draft Resolution can only be passed when over half of the corresponding assembly members approve. Before voting, all assembly members have the rights to debate and express their own opinions. Members of the minority groups have the right to reserve their own opinions, but they have to fully obey the Party Resolution and are not allowed to sabotage the Resolution. The authoritative Party bodies should conduct a research about the minority opinions and are not allowed to discriminate against the "minority" members.
The Party bodies are allowed to make decisions within their assigned authority, however the decisions are not allowed to violate the general principles and policies of the Party, the state's laws, the Resolution of the Party bodies at the higher levels.

See also

References

External links 
 On Party Unity. Vladimir Lenin.
 On Democratic-Centralism & The Regime. Leon Trotsky.
 Notes on democratic centralism. Tony Cliff. June 1968.
 Bolshevism, Fraudulent Practice Of Democratic Centralism. Albert Weisbord. 1976.
 On Democratic Centralism. PL Magazine. 1982.
 On democratic centralism. Mick Armstrong. 2000.
 Democratic Centralism.
 Our view of democratic centralism must change by Paul and Malcolm Saba.

Communist terminology
Political terminology
Ideology of the Communist Party of the Soviet Union
Types of democracy
Marxism–Leninism
Leninism